John Gray Richardson (1849–1924) was a priest in the Church of England.

Family
Richardson was the son of Samuel B. Richardson of Sheffield. He studied at Trinity College, Cambridge and graduated in 1872. He was ordained in the Church of England in 1875 and vicar of Monks Kirby, Warwickshire, St. John the Evangelist, Darlington and then St. Mary's Church, Nottingham. He was appointed rural dean of Nottingham in 1886 and Archdeacon of Nottingham in 1894. He was appointed rector of Southwell Minster in 1900. He died in 1924 at Coombe Fishacre House, Newton Abbot.

References

The Times, Obituary, 15 July 1924.

1924 deaths
19th-century English Anglican priests
20th-century English Anglican priests
Alumni of Trinity College, Cambridge
Vicars of St Mary's Church, Nottingham
Archdeacons of Nottingham
1849 births